Divine Mad Love is an album by American jazz multi-instrumentalist Sabir Mateen, which was recorded in 1997 and released on the Eremite label.

Reception

The Penguin Guide to Jazz says "Very much a group effort, with solo spots for both bassist and drummer, this seems too consciously designed to show off Mateen's not yet developed multi-instrumentalist."

The JazzTimes review by Amiri Baraka states "Full of energy and desire, without the wholeness or interior rationale of clear, riveting aesthetic cohesion."

Track listing
"Glory & Prause to the Most High" – 6:32
"Checking in with Yourself" – 18:55
"Conversation/Lunch before Departure" – 4:51
"Running into the Truth (after Chasing a Lie)" – 9:57
"Illuminations Flute" – 5:51
"Divine Mad Love" – 8:27
"Illuminations Bass" – 1:25
"Illuminations Drums" – 2:13
"WhyDidJaDolt?" – 2:19

Personnel
Laurence Cook – percussion
Sabir Mateen – alto sax, tenor sax, clarinet, flute
John Voigt – bass, vocals

References

1998 albums
Sabir Mateen albums
Eremite Records albums